Domenico Minio (6 March, 1628 – 5 June, 1698) was a Roman Catholic prelate who served as Bishop of Caorle (1684–1698).<

Biography
Domenico Minio was born in Burano, Italy on 6 March 1628. On 24 April 1684, he was appointed during the papacy of Pope Innocent XI as Bishop of Caorle. On 1 May 1684, he was consecrated bishop by Alessandro Crescenzi (cardinal), Cardinal-Priest of Santa Prisca, with Francesco Maria Giannotti, Bishop of Segni, and Francesco Onofrio Hodierna, Bishop of Bitetto, serving as co-consecrators. He served as Bishop of Caorle until his death on 5 June 1698.

References 

17th-century Roman Catholic bishops in the Republic of Venice
Bishops appointed by Pope Innocent XI
1628 births
1698 deaths